Rębowo may refer to the following places:
Rębowo, Gostyń County in Greater Poland Voivodeship (west-central Poland)
Rębowo, Konin County in Greater Poland Voivodeship (west-central Poland)
Rębowo, Masovian Voivodeship (east-central Poland)
Rębowo, Lubusz Voivodeship (west Poland)
Rębowo, Pomeranian Voivodeship (north Poland)